Help Me Durdana  is a 2019 Pakistani comedy television film aired on ARY Digital on 5 June 2019. It is co-produced by Fahad Mustafa and Dr. Ali Kazmi under their banner Big Bang Entertainment. It has Yasir Hussain, Ushna Shah and Mehmood Aslam in leads.

Cast
Yasir Hussain as Daniyal aka Dino/Durdana; Dino's mother (dual role)
Ushna Shah as Maheen (Mahi)
Mehmood Aslam as Chaudhry Sahab  (Maheen's father)
Noaman Sami as Dino's friend
Zulqarnain Haider as Feeqa

Controversy
A week before the release of telefilm, Hussain became a victim of trolls and news when he commented offensive words against LGBT community on his Instagram account. He posted a promo picture of telefilm where he was wearing a Saree as it was the requirement of his role in the project. The fan commented ‘Why don’t you guys hire an actual transgender?’, to which Hussain replied, ‘matlab apko job chahye’ (English: "Means, you want this role"). Many people criticize this act of Hussain and find it offensive. Reviewer from The Express Tribune called this as transphobic act to which Hussain said, "I have immense regard for transpersons". He further said that people misunderstood his role as he was playing a role of a mother not a transgender in the project.

References

Pakistani television films
Urdu-language television shows
2019 films
2019 comedy films